Ronald Duguay (born July 6, 1957) is a Canadian former professional ice hockey player and coach who played 12 seasons in the National Hockey League (NHL) from 1977 through 1989, and served four seasons as a minor league coach. As a player, he featured in the 1979 Stanley Cup Finals with the Rangers.

He appeared as an in-studio analyst during MSG Network's coverage of the New York Rangers from 2007 to 2018. He was born in the Sudbury region of northern Ontario, and as a child resided in Val Caron, Ontario. Duguay played junior hockey for the hometown Sudbury Wolves of the Ontario Hockey League.

Junior career
Duguay played for his hometown Sudbury Wolves of the OMJHL throughout his entire junior career spanning from 1973 to 1977. He was a very valuable player for the Wolves and one of the team's top scorers. He scored a high of 134 points in the 1975–76 OMJHL season which helped the team win the Hamilton Spectator Trophy as the best team in the regular season and make the league finals where they lost to the Hamilton Fincups in six games.

Duguay was selected onto the national junior team for the 1977 World Junior Ice Hockey Championships. There, he recorded 1 goal and 4 assist to total 5 points in 5 games as Canada finished in second place.

NHL career
Duguay was drafted 13th overall by the New York Rangers in the 1977 NHL amateur draft. He played 864 career NHL games, scoring 274 goals and 346 assists for 620 points.

New York Rangers
After being drafted in 1977, Duguay made the jump directly from junior hockey to the NHL, with 20 goals in his rookie year. Duguay played his first six seasons in New York, where he was known as much for his long hair and flashy behaviour as he was for his play on the ice.

With the Rangers, Duguay set a team record, for the fastest goal at the start of a game, at 9 seconds, on April 6, 1980, against the Philadelphia Flyers.  Suffering injuries, his production did not progress as hoped, but after playing for Team Canada in the 1981 Canada Cup, his play improved, and in 1981–82 led the Rangers in scoring with 40 goals.  That same season, he played in the NHL All-Star Game, representing the Rangers on the Wales Conference squad. In 1982–83 Duguay's numbers dipped, and he only scored 19 goals. Rangers coach Herb Brooks clashed with Duguay over his play and popularity in New York's night life, and on June 13, 1983, Duguay, Eddie Mio and Eddie Johnstone were traded to the Detroit Red Wings, for Willie Huber, Mark Osborne and Mike Blaisdell.

During Duguay's time with the Rangers, he took part in some of team president Sonny Werblin's schemes to make the Rangers more hip and visible in disco-era New York City. This includes singing on "Hockey Sock Rock", written by Alan Thicke.  The song featured vocals by Duguay, Phil Esposito, Pat Hickey, Dave Maloney and John Davidson. It was released as a 45, as Platinum Records 1217–75 in 1979.

Detroit Red Wings
Playing in Detroit, Duguay's career was revitalized, and in 1983–84 he was third on the Red Wings with 33 goals, and second on the team with 47 assists, which placed him third overall on the team for points, with 80. In 1984–85 he was second on the Red Wings in all three categories, with 38 goals, 51 assists and 89 total points, the best offensive season of his career. At the trade deadline in 1985–86 Duguay was traded to the Pittsburgh Penguins for Doug Shedden.

Pittsburgh Penguins
Duguay played parts of only two seasons in Pittsburgh, and his production was never as good again as it had been in New York or Detroit. On January 21, 1987, Pittsburgh traded Duguay to his original team, the Rangers, in exchange for Chris Kontos, reuniting Duguay with former teammate, and then-Rangers general manager, Phil Esposito.

Return to the Rangers
Duguay re-signed with the Rangers in the summer of 1987.
It was towards the end of his second stint with the Rangers that Duguay was sent to the minors for the first time, playing two games with the Colorado Rangers of the IHL.

Los Angeles Kings
After briefly returning to the Rangers, Duguay finished his NHL career with the Los Angeles Kings in 1988–89. An attempted comeback with the Toronto Maple Leafs in 1990, as well as one with the Tampa Bay Lightning, where Phil Esposito was the general manager in 1992 was not successful.

Minor league career as player and coach

San Diego Gulls
Duguay's career continued in the minor leagues for a few years after his final NHL season. He played 22 games in Europe with Mannheim ERC (German Bundesliga) during the 1989–90 season, then returned to the United States where he played two seasons in the IHL with the San Diego Gulls. Following the 1991–92 season he retired, but three years later resumed playing, again, for the San Diego Gulls, who were now members of the WCHL. Duguay explained that he was inspired to return to hockey to help the then injury-riddled team; he also said that he wanted his children, who had been too young to see him play in the NHL, to see him in action.

Duguay finished the 1995–96 season with the Gulls, scoring eight goals and nine assists in only 12 games. Over the next two seasons, Duguay played in just five games for the Gulls. In 1998–99 he jumped to the Jacksonville Lizard Kings of the (ECHL), but skated in just one game before commencing his second retirement.

Jacksonville Barracudas
In 2003, he joined the Jacksonville Barracudas, then playing in the Atlantic Coast Hockey League. Duguay played six games as a Barracudas forward, then took over as the team's head coach. In the 2003–2004 season Duguay led the Barracudas, now playing in the World Hockey Association 2, to the league's best record and playoff championship. In 2004 the Barracudas joined the newly formed Southern Professional Hockey League.  With Duguay as coach, the Barracudas' overall record over 3 seasons was 92–92–0–3 with a 6–3 playoff record.

Duguay resigned as coach after an unsuccessful 2005–06 season, in which more than 50 different players left the team as it finished with a 15–39–0–2 record. On his resignation, he told the Florida Times-Union that he was "tired."

Post-hockey career
From 2007 to 2018, Duguay was an analyst for MSG Network's television coverage of Rangers games, also appearing regularly on MSG's weekly Hockey Night Live! program. Duguay's contract with MSG expired in 2018 and was not renewed.

On March 21 and 22, 2009, nearly six years after playing his final professional game, Duguay played two games in the EPHL, one game each with the Brooklyn Aces and the Jersey Rockhoppers, to raise money for the Garden of Dreams Foundation, a nonprofit organization associated with Madison Square Garden. Duguay signed a waiver and played his game with the Brooklyn Aces without a helmet, which allowed his hair to flow free as it did when he played in the NHL. With 37 seconds left in regulation, he assisted on the game-tying goal, but the Aces would lose 4–3 in overtime.

In 2009, Duguay competed in the first season of the Battle of the Blades skating competition on CBC Television, partnered with Barbara Underhill. The charity he skated for was World Vision Canada.

The Sudbury Wolves have retired his jersey.

In the 2009 book 100 Ranger Greats, the authors ranked Duguay at No. 49 all-time of the 901 New York Rangers who had played during the team's first 82 seasons.

On New Year's Eve 2011, Duguay participated in the 2012 Winter Classic Alumni game pitting legends of the Rangers against the legends of the Philadelphia Flyers.</ref>

Personal life
Duguay grew up in Carol Richard Park in the township of Valley East, also known as Vallée-Est, now part of Greater Sudbury.  He played at the Centennial Arena in Hanmer.

In the NHL, Duguay was noted for his long curly hair which would blow behind him as he skated without a helmet. He and teammates Phil Esposito, Dave Maloney and Anders Hedberg appeared in a TV commercial for Sasson designer jeans.

On December 1, 1983, Duguay married California model Robin Bobo; the couple had two daughters before the marriage ended in divorce. In the 1990s, he married former fashion model Kim Alexis. After marrying Alexis, Duguay moved to Ponte Vedra Beach, Florida. The couple divorced in 2016.

In 2022, Slate and other publications referred to him as the "reported beau" of former Alaska governor and 2008 vice presidential candidate Sarah Palin. In February 2022, Duguay confirmed that the couple was indeed dating. In January 2022, Duguay was seen dining outdoors with Palin in a restaurant, Elio's, on Second Avenue in the Upper East Side of New York City. Palin had recently tested positive for Covid-19. A photographer was allegedly assaulted by Duguay after the photographer questioned the danger of being in the company of Palin after her positive diagnosis.

Career statistics

Regular season and playoffs

International

References

External links
 

1957 births
Living people
Battle of the Blades participants
Brooklyn Aces players
Canadian expatriate ice hockey players in the United States
Canadian ice hockey centres
Canadian ice hockey coaches
Colorado Rangers players
Detroit Red Wings players
Franco-Ontarian people
Ice hockey people from Ontario
Jacksonville Barracudas (ACHL) players
Jacksonville Lizard Kings players
Los Angeles Kings players
National Hockey League All-Stars
National Hockey League first-round draft picks
New York Rangers draft picks
New York Rangers players
Pittsburgh Penguins players
San Diego Gulls (IHL) players
San Diego Gulls (WCHL) players
Southern Professional Hockey League coaches
Sportspeople from Greater Sudbury
Sudbury Wolves players
Winnipeg Jets (WHA) draft picks
World Hockey Association first round draft picks